Judith Massare is a paleontologist specializing in Mesozoic marine reptile research. In 1987,  Massare published an analysis of plesiosaur feeding habits. She concluded that the long-necked plesiosauroids ate soft prey. Liopleurodon and its relatives, on the other hand, had teeth resembling those of killer whales and probably ate larger, bonier prey. The next year, Massare analyzed Mesozoic marine reptile swimming abilities and found that long-necked plesiosaurs would have been significantly slower than pliosaurs due to excess drag incurred from their large round bodies.

Footnotes

References
 Ellis, Richard, (2003) Sea Dragons - Predators of the Prehistoric Oceans. University Press of Kansas. .

Women paleontologists
Living people
Year of birth missing (living people)